Concept albums have been produced by bands and solo artists across all musical genres. In popular music, a concept album is an album that is "unified by a theme, which can be instrumental, compositional, narrative, or lyrical." The following is a list with specific verification by reliable sources of being notable concept albums.

0–9 
  2nd Chapter of Acts – The Roar of Love (1980)
  The 1975 - A Brief Inquiry into Online Relationships (2018)

A 
 Ab-Soul – Control System (2012)
 A Tribe Called Red – We Are the Halluci Nation (2016)
 Aesop Rock – Labor Days (2001)
 After Forever – Invisible Circles (2004)
 Against Me! – Searching for a Former Clarity (2005)
 Against Me! – Transgender Dysphoria Blues (2014)
 Ahab – The Call of the Wretched Sea (2006)
 Ahab – The Boats of the "Glen Carrig" (2015)
 Al Stewart – Past, Present, and Future (1973)
 Alan Parsons – The Time Machine (1999)
 The Alan Parsons Project – Ammonia Avenue (1984)
 The Alan Parsons Project – Eve (1979)
 The Alan Parsons Project – Eye in the Sky (1982)
 The Alan Parsons Project – Gaudi (1987)
 The Alan Parsons Project – I Robot (1977)
 The Alan Parsons Project – Pyramid (1978)
 The Alan Parsons Project – Stereotomy (1985)
 The Alan Parsons Project – Tales of Mystery and Imagination (1976)
 The Alan Parsons Project – The Turn of a Friendly Card (1980)
 The Alan Parsons Project – Vulture Culture (1985)
 Alesana – The Emptiness (2010)
 Alesana – Confessions (2015)
 Alesana – A Place Where the Sun Is Silent (2011)
 Alice Cooper – School's Out (1972)
 Alice Cooper – Welcome to My Nightmare (1975)
 Alice Cooper – Alice Cooper Goes to Hell (1976)
 Alice Cooper – From the Inside (1978)
 Alice Cooper – The Last Temptation (1994)
 Alice Cooper – Along Came a Spider (2008)
 Alice in Chains – Dirt (1992)
 Allen Toussaint – Southern Nights (1975)
 Alter Bridge – AB III (2010)
 Amon Amarth – Jomsviking (2016)
 Anaïs Mitchell – Hadestown (2010)
 Ancient – The Cainian Chronicle (1996)
 Andrew Lloyd Webber – Evita (1976)
 Angels and Airwaves – We Don't Need To Whisper (2006)
 Angels and Airwaves – I-Empire (2007)
 Angels and Airwaves – Love (2010)
 Angels and Airwaves – Love: Part Two (2011)
 Angels and Airwaves – The Dream Walker (2014)
 Angra – Temple of Shadows (2004)
 The Antlers – Hospice (2009)
 Aphrodites Child – 666 (1972)
 The Apples In Stereo - Travellers In Space and Time (2010)
 The Appleseed Cast – Mare Vitalis (2000)
 Arcade Fire – Funeral (2004)
 Arcade Fire – Neon Bible (2007)
 Arcade Fire – The Suburbs (2010)
 Arcade Fire – Reflektor (2013)
 Arcade Fire – Everything Now (2017)
 Arctic Monkeys – Tranquility Base Hotel & Casino (2018)
 Arctic Monkeys – Whatever People Say I Am, That's What I'm Not (2006)
 Armor for Sleep – What to Do When You Are Dead (2005)
 Attack Attack! – This Means War (2012)
 AURORA – A Different Kind of Human (Step 2) (2019)
 AURORA – The Gods We Can Touch (2022)
 The Avalanches - Since I Left You (2003)
 Avantasia – The Metal Opera (2001)
 Avantasia – The Metal Opera Part II (2002)
 Avantasia – The Scarecrow (2008)
 Avantasia – The Mystery of Time (2013)
 Avantasia – Ghostlights (2016)
 Avenged Sevenfold – The Stage (2016)
 Ayreon – The Final Experiment (1995)
 Ayreon – Into the Electric Castle (1998)
 Ayreon – Universal Migrator Part 1: The Dream Sequencer (2000)
 Ayreon – Universal Migrator Part 2: Flight of the Migrator (2000)
 Ayreon – The Human Equation (2004)
 Ayreon – 01011001 (2008)
 Ayreon – The Theory of Everything (2013)
 Ayreon – The Source (2017)
 Ayreon – Transitus (2020)

B 
The Band – The Band (1969)
Barbra Streisand – Wet (1979)
 Bastille – Doom Days (2019)
 Bat for Lashes – The Bride (2016)
 Bathory – Blood on Ice (1996)
 The Beach Boys – Surfin' Safari (1962)
 The Beach Boys – Surfin' U.S.A. (1963)
 The Beach Boys – Surfer Girl (1963)
 The Beach Boys – Little Deuce Coupe (1963)
 The Beach Boys – Shut Down Volume 2 (1964)
 The Beach Boys – All Summer Long (1964)
 The Beach Boys – The Beach Boys Today! (1965)
 The Beach Boys – Pet Sounds (1966)
 The Beach Boys – Smile (1966-1967)
 The Beatles - Revolver (1966)
 The Beatles - Rubber Soul (1965)
 The Beatles – Sgt. Pepper's Lonely Hearts Club Band (1967)
 Bee Gees – Odessa (1969)
 Between the Buried and Me – Colors (2007)
 Between the Buried and Me – The Parallax: Hypersleep Dialogues (2011)
 Between the Buried and Me – The Parallax II: Future Sequence (2012)
 Between the Buried and Me – Coma Ecliptic (2015)
 Between the Buried and Me  – Automata II (2018)
 Beyoncé – I Am... Sasha Fierce (2008)
 Beyoncé – Lemonade (2016)
 Big K.R.I.T. – 4eva Is a Mighty Long Time (2017)
 Big K.R.I.T. – Cadillactica (2014)
 Big Sean – I Decided (2017)
 Billy Idol – Cyberpunk (1993)
 Billy Joel –  An Innocent Man (1983)
 Billy Joel - The Nylon Curtain (1982) 
 Björk – Biophilia (2011)
 Björk – Vulnicura (2015)
 Black Veil Brides – Wretched and Divine: The Story of the Wild Ones (2013)
 Blackfield – Blackfield V (2017)
 Blind Guardian – Nightfall in Middle-Earth (1998)
 Blind Guardian – Legacy of the Dark Lands (2019)
 Blink-182 – Take Off Your Pants And Jacket (2001)
 Blink-182 – Blink-182 (2003)
 Blue Man Group – The Complex (2003)
 Blue October – Any Man in America (2010)
 Blue Öyster Cult – Imaginos (1988)
 Blues Traveler – Decisions of the Sky (2000)
 Blur – Modern Life is Rubbish (1993)
 Blur – Parklife (1994)
 Bobby Conn – Rise Up! (1998)
 Bomb the Music Industry! – Vacation (2011)
 Bon Iver – For Emma, Forever Ago (2007)
 Boublil & Schönberg – Les Misérables (1980)
 Boys Night Out – Trainwreck (2005)
 Brendon Small – Brendon Small's Galaktikon (2012)
 Brian Wilson - Smile (2004)
 Bring Me the Horizon – Amo (2019)
Bring Me the Horizon – That's the Spirit (2015)
 Britney Spears – Britney Jean (2013)
 Bryan Scary and the Shredding Tears – Flight of the Knife (2008)
 BTS - Map of the Soul: 7 (2020)
The Buggles – The Age of Plastic (1980)
 Burzum – Dauði Baldrs (1997)
 Burzum – Hliðskjálf (1999)

 C 
 Camel – The Snow Goose (1975)
 Camel – Moonmadness (1976)
 Camel – Nude (1981)
 Camel – Stationary Traveller (1984)
 Camel – Harbour of Tears (1996)
 Camper Van Beethoven – New Roman Times (2004)
 Candy Claws – Ceres & Calypso in the Deep Time (2013)
 Caparezza – Le dimensioni del mio caos (2008)
 Caparezza – Il sogno eretico (2011)
 Caparezza – Museica (2014)
 Car Seat Headrest – Twin Fantasy (2011)
 Carach Angren – Lammendam (2008)
 Carach Angren – Death Came Through a Phantom Ship (2010)
 Carach Angren – Where the Corpses Sink Forever (2012)
 Carach Angren – This Is No Fairytale (2015)
 The Caretaker – An Empty Bliss Beyond This World (2011)
The Caretaker – Everywhere at the End of Time (2016-2019)
 Cat System Corp. – News at 11 (2016)
 Catch 22 – Permanent Revolution (2006)
 Cherry Poppin' Daddies – Susquehanna (2008)
 Childish Gambino – Because the Internet (2013)
Childish Gambino – Camp (2011)
 Christopher Lee – Charlemagne: By the Sword and the Cross (2010)
 Christopher Lee – Charlemagne: The Omens of Death (2013)
 Chumbawamba – Pictures of Starving Children Sell Records (1986)
 Clairo – Sling (2021)
 clipping. – Splendor & Misery (2016)
CMX – Talvikuningas (2007)
 Coheed and Cambria – The Afterman: Ascension (2012)
 Coheed and Cambria – The Afterman: Descension (2013)
 Coheed and Cambria – Year of the Black Rainbow (2010)
 Coheed and Cambria – The Second Stage Turbine Blade (2002)
 Coheed and Cambria – In Keeping Secrets of Silent Earth: 3 (2003)
 Coheed and Cambria – Good Apollo, I'm Burning Star IV, Volume One: From Fear Through the Eyes of Madness (2005)
 Coheed and Cambria – Good Apollo, I'm Burning Star IV, Volume Two: No World for Tomorrow (2007)
 Coheed and Cambria – Vaxis – Act I: The Unheavenly Creatures (2018)
 Coheed and Cambria – Vaxis – Act II: A Window of the Waking Mind (2022)
 Cold 187um – The Only Solution (2012)
 Coldplay – Mylo Xyloto (2011)
Coldplay – Music Of The Spheres (2021)
 Cradle of Filth – Godspeed on the Devil's Thunder (2008)
 Cradle of Filth – Darkly, Darkly, Venus Aversa (2010)
 Creeper – Eternity, in Your Arms (2017)
 Cursive – Domestica (2000)
 Cursive – The Ugly Organ (2003)
 Cursive – Happy Hollow (2006)
 Cynic – Carbon-Based Anatomy (2011)

 D 
Daft Punk – Discovery (2001)
 Danger Doom - The Mouse and the Mask (2005)
Daniel Liam Glyn – Changing Stations (2016)
Daniel Liam Glyn – Nocturnes (2020)
Dave —  Psychodrama (2019)
 Dave Greenslade – Cactus Choir (1976)
 David Bowie – The Rise and Fall of Ziggy Stardust and the Spiders from Mars (1972)
 David Bowie – Diamond Dogs (1974)
 David Bowie – Outside (1995)
 Deadlock – Manifesto (2008)
 The Dear Hunter – Act I: The Lake South, The River North (2006)
 The Dear Hunter – Act II: The Meaning of, and All Things Regarding Ms. Leading (2007)
 The Dear Hunter – Act III: Life and Death (2009)
 The Dear Hunter – Act IV: Rebirth in Reprise (2015)
 The Dear Hunter – Act V: Hymns with the Devil in Confessional (2016)
 The Dear Hunter – The Color Spectrum (2011)
 Death Cab for Cutie – Transatlanticism (2003)
 The Decemberists – The Crane Wife (2006)
 The Decemberists – The Hazards of Love (2009)
 Defeater – Travels (2008)
 Defeater – Lost Ground (2004)
 Defeater – Empty Days & Sleepless Nights (2011)
 Defeater – Letters Home (2013)
 Defeater – Abandoned (2015)
 Deftones – White Pony (2000)
 Deltron 3030 – Deltron 3030 (2000)
 Denzel Curry - TA13OO (2018)
 Denzel Curry - Melt My Eyez See Your Future (2022)
 Devin Townsend – Ziltoid the Omniscient (2007)
 Dexys – One Day I'm Going to Soar (2012)
 Die Ärzte – Le Frisur (1996)
 Dimmu Borgir – In Sorte Diaboli (2007)
 Dio – Magica (2000)
 Dionysos – La Mécanique du Cœur (2007)
 Dominici – O3: A Trilogy (2005)
 Donald Fagen – Kamakiriad (1993)
 Donald Fagen – The Nightfly (1982)
 Donna Summer – Four Seasons of Love (1976)
 Donna Summer – I Remember Yesterday (1977)
 Donna Summer – Once Upon a Time... (1977)
 Dr. Octagon – Dr. Octagonecologyst (1996)
 Dragonland – Under the Grey Banner (2011)
 Dream Theater – Metropolis Pt. 2: Scenes from a Memory (1999)
 Dream Theater – Six Degrees of Inner Turbulence (2002)
 Dream Theater – The Astonishing (2016)
 Dredg – Leitmotif (1999)
 Dredg – El Cielo (2002)
 Drive-By Truckers - Southern Rock Opera (2001)
 Dropkick Murphys – Going Out in Style (2011)
 Duran Duran – Seven and the Ragged Tiger (1983)

 E 
 Eagles – Desperado (1973)
 Eagles – Hotel California (1976)
 The Early November – The Mother, the Mechanic, and the Path (2006)
 Earth Crisis – Salvation of Innocents (2014)
 Ed Kuepper – Jean Lee and the Yellow Dog (2007)
 Edge of Sanity – Crimson (1996)
 Edge of Sanity - Crimson II (2003)
 Elbow – The Seldom Seen Kid (2008)
 Electric Light Orchestra – Eldorado (1974)
 Electric Light Orchestra – Time (1981)
 Elton John – Tumbleweed Connection (1970)
 Elton John – Captain Fantastic and the Brown Dirt Cowboy (1975)
 Eluveitie –  Helvetios (2012)
 Elvis Costello – The Delivery Man (2004)
 Emerson, Lake & Palmer – Tarkus (1971)
 Eminem – Relapse (2009)
Enigma – MCMXC a.D. (1990)
Enigma – The Cross of Changes (1993)
Enigma – The Fall of a Rebel Angel (2016)
 Epica – The Divine Conspiracy (2007)
 Erykah Badu – New Amerykah Part One (2008)
 Erykah Badu – New Amerykah Part Two (2010)
 Ethel Cain - Preacher's Daughter (2022)
 Evelyn Evelyn – Evelyn Evelyn (2010)
 Everclear – Songs from an American Movie Vol. One: Learning How to Smile (2000)
 Everclear – Songs from an American Movie Vol. Two: Good Time for a Bad Attitude (2000)
 Evergrey – In Search of Truth (2001)
 Evermore – Truth of the World: Welcome to the Show (2009)

 F 
 Fabrizio De André – La buona novella (1970)
 Fabrizio De André – Tutti morimmo a stento (1968)
 Fabrizio De André – Storia di un impiegato (1973)
 Fabrizio De André – Non al denaro non all'amore né al cielo (1971)
 Fairport Convention – Babbacombe Lee (1971)
 Falling Up – Fangs! (2009)
 Fantômas – Suspended Animation (2005)
 Fates Warning – A Pleasant Shade of Gray (1997)
 Father John Misty – God's Favorite Customer (2018)
 Father John Misty – I Love You, Honeybear (2015)
 Father John Misty – Pure Comedy (2017)
 Fear Factory – Demanufacture (1995)
 Fear Factory – Obsolete (1998)
 Fear Factory – The Industrialist (2012)
 Fear Factory – Genexus (2015)
 Fields of the Nephilim – Elizium (1990)
 Fields of the Nephilim – Mourning Sun (2005)
 The Fiery Furnaces – Blueberry Boat (2004)
 The Fiery Furnaces – Rehearsing My Choir (2005)
 The Flaming Lips – Yoshimi Battles The Pink Robots (2002)
 The Flaming Lips – King's Mouth (2019)
 Flaming Youth – Ark 2 (1969)
 FM Static – Dear Diary (2009)
 Foster the People – Supermodel (2014)
 Foxygen – ...And Star Power (2014)
 Frank Ocean – Channel Orange (2012)
 Frank Ocean – Blonde (2016)
 Frank Sinatra - Come Dance with Me! (1959)
 Frank Sinatra - Come Fly with Me (1958)
 Frank Sinatra - Frank Sinatra Sings for Only the Lonely (1958)
 Frank Sinatra – In the Wee Small Hours (1955)
 Frank Sinatra - Songs for Swingin' Lovers! (1956)
 Frank Sinatra – Songs for Young Lovers (1954)
 Frank Sinatra – Swing Easy! (1954)
 Frank Sinatra - The Voice of Frank Sinatra (1946)
 Frank Sinatra - Where Are You? (1957)
 Frank Zappa — Joe's Garage (1979)
 Frank Zappa and The Mothers of Invention – Freak Out! (1966)
 Frank Zappa and The Mothers of Invention - We're Only in It for the Money (1968)
 Franz Ferdinand – Tonight (2009)
 Fucked Up – David Comes to Life (2011)
 Fugees – The Score (1996)
 Funeral for a Friend – Tales Don't Tell Themselves (2007)

 G 
 Gallows – Grey Britain (2009)
 The Game – Jesus Piece (2012)
 Gatsbys American Dream – Ribbons and Sugar (2003)
 Genesis – From Genesis to Revelation (1969)
 Genesis – The Lamb Lies Down on Broadway (1974)
 Gentle Giant – Interview (1976)
 Gentle Giant – Three Friends (1972)
 The Gentle Storm – The Diary (2015)
 Ghostface Killah – 36 Seasons (2014)
 Ghostface Killah – Twelve Reasons to Die (2013)
 Girls Aloud – Chemistry (2005)
 Glass Animals - Zaba (2014)
 Glass Animals – How to Be a Human Being (2016)
 Glass Animals - Dreamland (2020)
 God Forbid – IV: Constitution of Treason (2005)
 Gojira – From Mars to Sirius (2005)
 Goldfrapp – Tales of Us (2013)
 The Good Life – Album of the Year (2004)
 The Good, the Bad & the Queen – The Good, the Bad & the Queen (2007)
 The Good, the Bad & the Queen – Merrie Land (2018)
 Gorillaz –  Demon Days (2005) Gorillaz – Plastic Beach (2010)
 Gorillaz – Humanz (2017)
 Gorillaz - Cracker Island (2023)
 Graham Coxon – The Spinning Top (2009)
 Green Carnation – Light of Day, Day of Darkness (2001)
 Green Day – American Idiot (2004)
 Green Day – 21st Century Breakdown (2009)

 H 
 Haken – Aquarius (2010)
 Haken – Visions (2011)
 Halsey – Badlands (2015)
 Halsey – Hopeless Fountain Kingdom (2017)
Halsey – If I Can’t Have Love, I Want Power (2021)
 Harmonium – Si on avait besoin d'une cinquième saison (1975)
 Harmonium – L'Heptade (1976)
 Hawkwind – The Machine Stops (2016)
 Hawthorne Heights – Zero (2013)
 The Head and the Heart – The Head and the Heart (2011)
 Helloween – Keeper of the Seven Keys: Part I (1987)
 Helloween – Keeper of the Seven Keys: Part II (1988)
 Herbie Hancock - Maiden Voyage (1965)
 The Hold Steady – Separation Sunday (2005)
 Hooverphonic – Hooverphonic Presents Jackie Cane (2002)
 Horslips – The Táin (1976)
 House of Heroes – The End is Not the End (2008)
 House of Heroes – Colors (2016)
 Hüsker Dü – Zen Arcade (1984)

 I 
 Iced Earth – Night of the Stormrider (1991)
 Iced Earth – The Dark Saga (1996)
 Iced Earth – The Glorious Burden (2004)
 Iced Earth - Horror Show (2001)
 Iced Earth - Framing Armageddon: Something Wicked Part 1 (2007)
 Iced Earth - The Crucible of Man: Something Wicked Part 2 (2008)
 Insomnium – Winter's Gate (2016)
 IQ – Subterranea (1997)
 Iron Maiden – Seventh Son of a Seventh Son (1988)

 J 
 J Balvin - Colores (2020)
 J. Cole – 2014 Forest Hills Drive (2014)
 J. Cole – 4 Your Eyez Only (2016)
 Jack's Mannequin – Everything in Transit (2005)
 Jackson Browne - Running On Empty (1977)
 Janet Jackson - Control (1986)
 Janet Jackson – Janet Jackson's Rhythm Nation 1814 (1989)
 Janet Jackson – The Velvet Rope (1997)
 Janelle Monáe – Metropolis: Suite I (The Chase) (2007)
 Janelle Monáe – The ArchAndroid (2010)
 Janelle Monáe – The Electric Lady (2013)
 Janelle Monáe – Dirty Computer (2018)
Jazmine Sullivan – Heaux Tales (2021)
 Jay-Z – American Gangster (2007)
 Jeff Wayne – Jeff Wayne's Musical Version of The War of the Worlds (1978)
 Jethro Tull – Thick as a Brick (1972)
 Jethro Tull – A Passion Play (1973)
 Jethro Tull – Too Old to Rock and Roll, Too Young to Die (1975)
 Jethro Tull – Songs from the Wood (1977)
 Jhene Aiko – Trip (2017)
 Joe Jackson – Blaze of Glory (1989)
 John Coltrane - A Love Supreme (1965)
 Johnny Cash – Songs of Our Soil (1959)
 Johnny Cash – Ride This Train (1960)
 Johnny Cash – All Aboard the Blue Train (1962)
 Johnny Cash – Bitter Tears (1964)
 Johnny Cash – From Sea to Shining Sea (1968)
 Johnny Cash – America: A 200-Year Salute in Story and Song (1972)
 Johnny Cash – The Rambler (1977)
Jon Anderson – Olias of Sunhillow (1976)
Jonathan Coulton – Solid State (2017)
Joyner Lucas – ADHD (2020)
 Judas Priest – Nostradamus (2008)
 Judy Garland – The Letter (1959)

 K 
 Kamelot - Epica (2003)
 Kamelot – The Black Halo (2005)
 Kamelot – Silverthorn (2012)
 Kamelot – The Shadow Theory (2018)
 Kansas – Leftoverture (1976)
Kanye West — The College Dropout (2004)
Kanye West – Graduation (2007)
Kanye West – 808s & Heartbreak (2008)
Kanye West – My Beautiful Dark Twisted Fantasy (2010)
Kanye West – Yeezus (2013)
Kanye West – The Life of Pablo (2016)
Kanye West – ye (2018)
 Kate Bush – Hounds of Love (1985)
 Kate Bush –  Aerial (2005)
 Kate Bush –  50 Words For Snow (2011)
 Kayo Dot – Coyote (2010)
 Kekal – The Habit of Fire (2007)
 Kelly Clarkson - Piece By Piece (2015)
 Kendrick Lamar – Section.80 (2011)
 Kendrick Lamar – Good Kid, M.A.A.D City (2012)
 Kendrick Lamar – To Pimp a Butterfly (2015)
 Kendrick Lamar – DAMN. (2017)
 Kendrick Lamar - Mr. Morale & the Big Steppers (2022)
 Kenny Rogers – Gideon (1980)
Kenny Rogers & The First Edition - The Ballad of Calico (1972)
 Kid Cudi – Man on the Moon: The End of Day (2009)
 Kid Cudi – Man on the Moon II: The Legend of Mr. Rager (2010)
 Kid Cudi - Man on the Moon III: The Chosen (2020)
 Kid Creole and the Coconuts – Fresh Fruit in Foreign Places (1981)
 King Crimson – In the Court of the Crimson King (1969)
 King Diamond – Abigail (1987)
 King Diamond – "Them" (1988)
 King Geedorah – Take Me To Your Leader (2003)
King Gizzard and the Lizard Wizard – Eyes Like the Sky (2013)
 King Gizzard and the Lizard Wizard – I'm in Your Mind Fuzz (2014)
 King Gizzard and the Lizard Wizard – Quarters! (2015)
 King Gizzard and the Lizard Wizard – Paper Mâché Dream Balloon (2015)
 King Gizzard and the Lizard Wizard – Nonagon Infinity (2016)
 King Gizzard and the Lizard Wizard – Flying Microtonal Banana (2017)
 King Gizzard and the Lizard Wizard – Murder of the Universe (2017)
 King Gizzard and the Lizard Wizard - Fishing For Fishies (2019)
 King Gizzard and the Lizard Wizard - Infest the Rat's Nest (2019)
 King Gizzard and the Lizard Wizard - K.G. (2020)
 King Gizzard and the Lizard Wizard - L.W. (2021)
 King's X – Gretchen Goes to Nebraska (1989)
 The Kinks – Face to Face (1966)
 The Kinks – The Kinks Are the Village Green Preservation Society (1968)
 The Kinks – Arthur (Or the Decline and Fall of the British Empire) (1969)
 The Kinks – Lola Versus Powerman and the Moneygoround, Part One (1970)
 Kiss – Music from "The Elder" (1981)
 Kraftwerk – Autobahn (1974)
 Kraftwerk – Radio-Activity (1975)
 Kraftwerk – Trans-Europe Express (1977)
 Kraftwerk – The Man-Machine (1978)
 Klaatu – Hope (1977)

 L 
 Laura Marling – Once I Was an Eagle (2013)
 Lauryn Hill – The Miseducation of Lauryn Hill (1998)
 Leaves' Eyes – Vinland Saga (2005)
 Lil Yachty – Lil Boat (2016)
 Linkin Park – A Thousand Suns (2010)
 Little Brother – The Minstrel Show (2003)
 Liz Phair - Exile in Guyville (1993)
 Local H – As Good as Dead (1996)
 Local H – Pack Up the Cats (1998)
 Logic – Everybody (2017)
 Logic – The Incredible True Story (2015)
 Loïc Nottet – Selfocracy (2017)
Lord Huron – Strange Trails (2015)
Lord Huron – Vide Noir (2018)
 Lorde – Melodrama (2017)
 A Lot Like Birds – No Place (2013)
 Lou Reed – Berlin (1973)
 Lou Reed – New York (1989)
 Lou Reed – Magic and Loss (1992)
 Lou Reed – The Raven (2003)
 Ludo – Broken Bride (2005)
 Lupe Fiasco – Lupe Fiasco's The Cool (2007)
 Lupe Fiasco – DROGAS Wave (2018)

 M 
 Macabre – Dahmer (2000)
 Madonna – American Life (2003)
 Madonna – Erotica (1992)
 The Magnetic Fields – 50 Song Memoir (2017)
 The Magnetic Fields – 69 Love Songs (1990)
 Mägo de Oz – Finisterra (2000)
 Mägo de Oz – Gaia (2003)
 Mägo de Oz – Gaia II: La Voz Dormida (2005)
 Mägo de Oz – Gaia III: Atlantia (2010)
 Mai Kuraki – Kimi Omou: Shunkashūtō (2018)
 Manowar – Gods of War (2007)
 Mariah Carey – Me. I Am Mariah... The Elusive Chanteuse (2014)
Marianas Trench – Masterpiece Theatre (2009)
 Marianas Trench – Ever After (2011)
 Marianas Trench – Astoria (2015)
 Marianas Trench – Phantoms (2019) 
 Marillion – Brave (1994)
 Marillion – Clutching at Straws (1987)
 Marillion – Misplaced Childhood (1985)
 Marilyn Manson – Holy Wood (2000)
 Marilyn Manson – Mechanical Animals (1998)
 Marilyn Manson – Antichrist Superstar (1996)
 Marilyn Manson – Born Villain (2012)
 Marilyn Manson – We Are Chaos (2020)
 Marina and the Diamonds – Electra Heart (2012)
The Mars Volta – De-Loused in the Comatorium (2003)
 The Mars Volta – Frances the Mute (2005)
 The Mars Volta – The Bedlam in Goliath (2008)
 Marty Robbins – Gunfighter Ballads and Trail Songs (1959)
 Marty Robbins - More Gunfighter Ballads and Trail Songs (1960)
 Marvin Gaye – Here, My Dear (1978)
 Marvin Gaye – What's Going On (1971)
 Masta Ace – Disposable Arts (2001)
 Masta Ace – A Long Hot Summer (2004)
 Mastodon – Emperor of Sand (2017)
 Mastodon – Crack the Skye (2009)
 Mastodon – Blood Mountain (2006)
 Mastodon – Leviathan (2004)
 Matthew Good – Vancouver (2009)
 Maxwell – Maxwell's Urban Hang Suite (1996)
 Mayhem – A Grand Declaration of War (2000)
 Melanie Martinez – Cry Baby (2015)
 Melanie Martinez – K-12 (2019)
 Men Without Hats – Pop Goes the World (1987)
 Merle Travis - Folk Songs of the Hills (1946)
 Meshuggah – Catch Thirtythree (2005)
 Metallica - Master of Puppets (1986)
 MF Doom – Mm..Food (2004)
 MF Grimm – The Hunt for the Gingerbread Man (2007)
 Michael Franti and Spearhead – Stay Human (2001)
 Mike Oldfield – Tubular Bells (1973)
 Mike Oldfield - The Songs of Distant Earth (1994)
 Millie Jackson - Caught Up (1974)
 The Miracles - City of Angels (1975)
 The Moody Blues – Days of Future Passed (1967)
 The Moody Blues – In Search of the Lost Chord (1968)
 Mother Mother – The Sticks (2012)
Mount Eerie – A Crow Looked at Me (2017)
 The Mountain Goats – Tallahassee (2002)
 The Mountain Goats - The Sunset Tree (2005)

 The Mountain Goats – Beat the Champ (2015)
 The Mountain Goats – Goths (2017)
 Mr. Lif – Emergency Rations (2002)
 Mr. Lif – I Phantom (2002)
 Murder by Death – Who Will Survive, and What Will Be Left of Them? (2003)
 Muse – Black Holes and Revelations (2006)
 Muse – The Resistance (2009)
 Muse – Drones (2015)
 My Chemical Romance – Three Cheers for Sweet Revenge (2004)
 My Chemical Romance – The Black Parade (2005)
 My Chemical Romance – Danger Days: The True Lives of the Fabulous Killjoys (2010)

 N 
 Nat King Cole – Wild Is Love Natalia Kills – Perfectionist Neal Morse – Testimony Neal Morse – Testimony 2 Neal Morse – Sola Scriptura Nektar – Journey to the Centre of the EyeNeil Young – Greendale Neil Young – Fork in the Road Neon Neon – Stainless Style Nero – Welcome Reality Neutral Milk Hotel – In the Aeroplane Over the Sea Nevermore – Dreaming Neon Black N.F. - Mansion (album)
 The Nice – Five Bridges Nick Cave and the Bad Seeds – Murder Ballads Nightwish – Imaginaerum Nightwish – Endless Forms Most Beautiful Nine Inch Nails – The Downward Spiral Nine Inch Nails – The Fragile Nine Inch Nails – Year Zero Nirvana (UK) – The Story of Simon Simopath Nocturnus – The Key O 
The Ocean – AnthropocentricThe Ocean – HeliocentricThe Ocean – PelagialThe Ocean – Phanerozoic I: PalaeozoicThe Ocean – Phanerozoic II: Mesozoic / CenozoicOf Montreal – The Bird Who Continues to Eat the Rabbit's Flower Opeth – My Arms, Your Hearse Opeth  – Still Life Orphaned Land – Mabool Orphaned Land – The Never Ending Way of ORWarriOR Orchestral Manoeuvres in the Dark – Dazzle Ships Osmonds – The Plan Our Lady Peace – Spiritual Machines Outkast – Speakerboxxx/The Love BelowOwen Pallett – Heartland P 
 Pain of Salvation – In the Passing Light of Day Pain of Salvation – Remedy Lane Pallas – The Sentinel Pandora's Box – Original Sin Panic! at the Disco – Death of a Bachelor Paradox – Heresy Parliament – Chocolate City Parliament – Mothership Connection Parliament – The Clones of Dr. Funkenstein Parliament – Funkentelechy Vs. the Placebo Syndrome Parliament – Motor Booty Affair Parliament – Gloryhallastoopid Parliament – Trombipulation Paul Kantner/Jefferson Starship – Blows Against The Empire Paul McCartney – Egypt Station Pedro the Lion – Control Pedro the Lion – Winners Never Quit Pepe Deluxé – Queen of the Wave A Perfect Circle – Thirteenth Step A Perfect Circle – Emotive Periphery – Juggernaut: Alpha Periphery – Juggernaut: Omega Pescado Rabioso – Artaud Pharoahe Monch – PTSD Phish – Rift Pink Floyd –  The Dark Side of the Moon Pink Floyd – Wish You Were Here Pink Floyd – Animals Pink Floyd – The Wall Pink Floyd – The Final Cut Pink Floyd – The Division Bell Plan B – The Defamation of Strickland Banks Planet P Project – Pink World P.O.D. – The Awakening Poe – Haunted Pond – The Weather Porcupine Tree – Voyage 34 Porcupine Tree – Fear of a Blank Planet Porcupine Tree – The Incident The Pretty Things – S.F. Sorrow Primus – Primus & the Chocolate Factory with the Fungi Ensemble Primus – The Desaturating Seven Prince – Love Symbol Album Prince – Art Official Age Prince Paul – A Prince Among Thieves The Prize Fighter Inferno – My Brother's Blood Machine Protest the Hero – Kezia The Protomen – Act I: The Protomen The Protomen – Act II: The Father of Death Prototype – Catalyst Public Service Broadcasting –  The Race for Space Public Service Broadcasting – Every Valley Punch Brothers – The Phosphorescent Blues Pyramaze – Legend of the Bone Carver Q 
 Queen – Queen II Queensrÿche – Operation: Mindcrime Queensrÿche – Operation: Mindcrime II Queensrÿche – American Soldier Queens of the Stone Age – Songs for the Deaf R 
 Raekwon – Only Built 4 Cuban Linx...Raekwon – Only Built 4 Cuban Linx... Pt. II Raffi – Raffi Radio Randy Newman – Good Old Boys Randy Newman – Randy Newman's Faust Rasputina – Oh Perilous World! Ray Charles – The Genius Hits the Road The Receiving End of Sirens – The Earth Sings Mi Fa Mi Renaissance – Scheherazade and Other Stories Return To Forever – Romantic Warrior Rhapsody – Legendary Tales Rhapsody – Symphony of Enchanted Lands Rhapsody – Dawn of Victory Rhapsody – Rain of a Thousand Flames Rhapsody – Power of the Dragonflame Rhapsody – Symphony of Enchanted Lands II: The Dark Secret Rhapsody of Fire – Triumph or Agony Rhapsody of Fire – The Frozen Tears of Angels Rhapsody of Fire – From Chaos to Eternity Rich Mullins – A Liturgy, a Legacy, & a Ragamuffin Band Rick Wakeman – The Six Wives of Henry VIII Right Away, Great Captain – The Bitter End Right Away, Great Captain – The Eventually Home Right Away, Great Captain – The Church of the Good Thief Rising Appalachia – The Lost Mystique of Being in the Know Riverside – Love, Fear and the Time Machine Roger Waters – The Pros and Cons of Hitch Hiking Roger Waters – Radio K.A.O.S. Roger Waters – Amused to Death Roger Waters – Is This the Life We Really Want? The Roots – ...And Then You Shoot Your Cousin The Roots – Undun Rosalía – Los ángeles 
 Rosalía – El mal querer Rosanne Cash – The River & the Thread Royal Hunt – The MissionRush – Clockwork AngelsRZA – Bobby Digital in Stereo S 
 Sabaton – The Art of War Sabaton – Carolus Rex Sabaton – Heroes Sabaton – The Last Stand Sabaton – The Great War Sabaton – The War to End All Wars Sabbat (UK) – Dreamweaver (Reflections of Our Yesterdays)Saga (band) – The Chapters Live 
 Sarah Brightman – Dive Savatage – Streets: A Rock Opera Say Anything – In Defense of the Genre Scorpions – Humanity: Hour I Sepultura – Roots Sepultura – Dante XXI Sepultura – A-Lex Sepultura – Kairos Serge Gainsbourg – Histoire de Melody Nelson Serge Gainsbourg – Rock Around the Bunker Serge Gainsbourg – L'Homme à tête de chou Senses Fail – Still Searching Seventh Wonder – Mercy Falls Shadow Gallery – Tyranny Shadow Gallery – Room V Shinedown – Attention Attention Showbread – Anorexia Showbread – Nervosa Silverstein – A Shipwreck in the SandSilverstein – I Am Alive in Everything I Touch Silverstein – This Is How the Wind Shifts Simon & Garfunkel – Bookends Sixx:A.M. – The Heroin Diaries Soundtrack Skillet – Rise Sticky Fingaz – Blacktrash: The Autobiography of Kirk Jones The Smashing Pumpkins – Machina/The Machines of God The Smashing Pumpkins – Machina II/The Friends & Enemies of Modern Music The Smashing Pumpkins – Mellon Collie and the Infinite Sadness The Smashing Pumpkins – Teargarden by Kaleidyscope/Oceania Solefald – Pills against the Ageless Ills Solefald – An Icelandic Odyssey Spock's Beard – SnowStarset – Transmissions Steven Wilson – The Raven That Refused to Sing (And Other Stories) Steven Wilson – Hand. Cannot. Erase. Stone Sour – House of Gold & Bones – Part 1 Stone Sour – House of Gold & Bones – Part 2 Stratovarius – Visions The Streets – A Grand Don't Come For Free Styx – The Grand Illusion Styx – Kilroy Was Here Styx – Paradise Theatre Suede – Night Thoughts 
 Sufjan Stevens –  Illinois Sufjan Stevens –  Michigan Super Furry Animals – Hey Venus! Symphony X – V: The New Mythology Suite Symphony X – Paradise Lost Symphony X – Iconoclast SZA – Ctrl T 
 Talking Heads – Fear of Music Talking Heads – Naked Tally Hall – Good & Evil Tandy & Morgan – Earthrise Taproot – The Episodes Taylor Swift – Reputation Taylor Swift – Midnights Thrice – The Alchemy Index Thirty Seconds to Mars – 30 Seconds to Mars Thirty Seconds to Mars – This Is War Thirty Seconds to Mars – Love, Lust, Faith and Dreams T.I. – T.I. vs. T.I.P. Tori Amos – American Doll Posse Tori Amos – Scarlet's Walk Tori Amos – Strange Little Girls Tori Amos – Night of Hunters Trazendo a Arca – Salmos e Cânticos EspirituaisThe Tubes – The Completion Backward Principle Twenty One Pilots – Blurryface Twenty One Pilots – Trench Tyler, the Creator – Bastard Tyler, the Creator – Goblin Tyler, the Creator – IGOR U 
 Ulver – Nattens madrigal Unleash the Archers – Apex and its sequel Abyss 
 Urge Overkill – Exit the Dragon Utopia – Deface the Music V 
 The Vaccines - Back in Love City Vektor – Terminal Redux Venom – At War with Satan Vendetta Red –  Sisters of the Red Death Voivod – The Wake Volbeat – Outlaw Gentlemen & Shady Ladies W 
 W.A.S.P. – The Crimson IdolThe Weeknd – After HoursThe Weeknd – Dawn FM Ween – The MolluskWeezer – Pinkerton
 Weezer – Weezer (White Album)
 Willie Nelson – Red Headed Stranger Willie Nelson – Shotgun Willie Willie Nelson – Phases and Stages Willie Nelson – Yesterday's WineWill Wood - The Normal Album Within Temptation – The Unforgiving Whitechapel – The Somatic Defilement Whitechapel – The Valley Whitechapel – Kin The Who – The Who Sell Out The Who – Tommy The Who – Lifehouse The Who – Quadrophenia The Wonder Years – No Closer to Heaven Woody Guthrie – Dust Bowl Ballads Wyclef Jean – Wyclef Jean Presents The Carnival X 
 Xzibit – Man vs. Machine Y 
 Yes – Tales from Topographic Oceans''

Z

See also 
Lists of albums

References 

 
Concept album